Cape Traverse is a community in Prince County, Prince Edward Island, Canada.

A winter iceboat service crossed the Abegweit Passage between Cape Traverse to Cape Tormentine, New Brunswick for many decades during the 19th century and early 20th century.

Notable residents
Ephraim Bell Muttart, physician and political figure
John Howatt Bell, 14th premier of Prince Edward Island

Highways
Cape Traverse is served by Route 10.

References

Communities in Prince County, Prince Edward Island